Cherry Bing  was an American ska/rock band formed in Buffalo, New York, United States. They existed between 1999 and 2005.

The group was originally conceived by members Michael Angelakos, Adam Schroeder, Maxwell Scott and Jeff Poleon and Will Glazier while attending Amherst Middle School. Brass members William Glazier, Derek Kettner, Sam Korotkin and Andrew DeSabio were added soon after.

The band produced their first album The Buffalo Superheroes at BTF tapehouse in 2001. The songs "Cool Amherst Party" and "Call from China" achieved internet success later that year by cracking the top 50 played tracks on MP3.com.

The band's second album was titled 60 Hertz Signals EP and included the tracks "Marilynn, 2 O'Clock and Still Without You, Can't Fight, Flirting Penguins Raging Eskimos, and The Yearbook."  Singer/Guitarist/Songwriter Michael Angelakos parted with the group shortly after recording the album, but did make a few guest reappearances with the band, most notably at Amherst High School SpringFest in 2003.

Cherry Bing added guitarist Jeffery Czum and singer Shaant Hacikyan, (Both of whom later became members of Cute Is What We Aim For), in the spring of 2003.  Their respective first performances came at the aforementioned Amherst SpringFest and the Kenmore High School SpringFest.

After returning from a 5-date east coast mini-tour in the late summer of 2003, Andrew Desabio officially parted with the band.

Cherry Bing released the Its Your Day Demo and the In A Language All Our Own EP under their new self-coined genre, "Rock with Horns."  Notable tracks include "Stood Here Once," "Band-Aid Trophy Case," and the re-release of "Hate."

The band was featured in the NeXt section of the Buffalo News in 2004 for winning local radio station Kiss 98.5's "Battle of the Bands."

Cherry Bing took the stage at the Van's Warped Tour in August 2004.

October 31, 2004 marked the release of the band's final recording, and final performance, at the now-defunct Showplace Theatre on Grant Street in Buffalo, NY.

Years before forming Passion Pit and becoming a purveyor of gossamer synthpop, frontman Michael Angelakos was embedded in a much different music scene: ska. In 1999, while attending high school in Buffalo, New York, he founded a raucous ska band called Cherry Bing. Angelakos put out two releases with the group and played shows around the Upstate New York area before leaving to pursue other projects in 2002 (they would later join the Warped Tour without him in 2004).

Though a short-lived venture, footage of his time with Cherry Bing exists, giving fans a window into his pre-Passion Pit days, and shows just how music-oriented he was — no matter the genre — so early on. Cherry Bing performed a gig at Amherst High School in 2002.

Discography
 The Buffalo Superheroes, BFT Tapehouse, 2001
 The 60 Hertz EP, BFT Tapehouse, 2002
 Stood Here Once Demo, BFT Tapehouse, 2003
 In A Language All Our Own, Chameleon West, 2004

Band members
 Michael Angelakos,  vocals/guitar  1999-2002 (Passion Pit)
 Andrew DeSabio,  saxophone  1999-2003
 William Glazier,  trumpet/background vocals  1999-2005 
 Jeff Poleon,  vocals  1999-2001
 Adam Schroeder,  drums/vocals  1999-2005 
 Maxwell Scott,  bass  1999-2005
 Derek Kettner,  trombone  2001-2004
 Sam Korotkin,  trombone  2005
 Jeffery Czum,  guitar/vocals  2003-2005
 Shaant Hacikyan,  vocals  2003-2005

References

Punk rock groups from New York (state)
American ska musical groups
Musical groups from Buffalo, New York
1999 establishments in New York (state)